Museum Arnhem (formerly known as Gemeentemuseum Arnhem and then Museum voor Moderne Kunst Arnhem) is a museum of modern art, contemporary art, applied art and design in Arnhem, Netherlands, with art from the 20th century.
The museum reopened its doors on 13 May 2022 after a major renovation that lasted more than four years.

Previous directors have included Liesbeth Brandt Corstius.

References

External links 
 website Museum Arnhem

Museums in Arnhem